Buchdorf is a municipality in the district of Donau-Ries in Bavaria in Germany.

See also
Buchdahl

References

Donau-Ries